William C. W. Mow (Traditional Chinese: 毛昭寰; born 1936) is the former chairman and CEO of Bugle Boy Industries.

Biography
Mow was born in Hangchow, China, the son of Lieutenant General Mow Pang Tsu of the National Chinese Air Force. In May 1945, Pang Tsu was appointed as a member of the Sixth Kuomintang Central Executive Committee and eventually became a national government representative in the United States Aviation Committee and the United Nations Security Council.

In 1949 his wife, Wong Ay Chuan, and five of his six sons moved to the US to join General Mow in Washington, DC, where they lived in diplomatic housing. Their oldest son, David, stayed in Taiwan and served in the National Air Force. In the early 1950s, Pang Tsu was involved in a highly public embezzlement scandal that pitted him against the Chiang Kai-shek government in Taiwan. He fled to Mexico, leaving his family behind in the US. Forced to leave diplomatic housing in Washington, DC. William, his mother and four brothers settled in Great Neck, New York. There they opened a small restaurant called the Yangtze River Cafe.

Mow earned a BSEE from Rensselaer Polytechnic, an MSEE from the Polytechnic Institute of Brooklyn and a Ph.D. from Purdue University. After earning his Ph.D., Mow spent the years from 1967 to 1969 working for Litton Industries as a program manager before forming his first business in 1969. It was a computer-controlled instrumentation firm called Microdata. Microdata designed new ways to test large-scale integrated computer chips. By 1974, Microdata had annual sales of $12 million. In the mid–1970s, Mow sold Microdata to Cutler-Hammer, a conglomerate located in Milwaukee. He remained on as chairman and CEO, but resigned after the new owners accused him of concealing $2 million worth of losses. Later, in 1988, a California court cleared Mow of the accusations and found that Cutler-Hammer had actually been responsible for concealing the sales loss.

In 1976, Mow began exploring wholesale and retail clothing sales. He started Buckaroo International Inc., a boutique store, in 1977. In September 1980, Mow renamed the company Bugle Boy Industries and narrowed its focus to jeans and casual pants (parachute pants), appealing mainly to young males.

By 1991, Bugle Boy had broadened its strategy to appeal to young women, adults and children. Bugle Boy's sales increased from less than $10 million during the early 1980s to almost $190 million in 1987, and approximately $1 billion in the early 1990s including licensees. In 1996 Mow relocated the company's Hong Kong office into a special economic zone in China. Mow made it clear that he wanted to enter the Chinese market and set a goal of establishing 1,000 retail outlets in the country. By 1997, Bugle Boy had annual sales of over $1 billion, including licensee sales. It employed 2,200 people, including 400 people in California. Bugle Boy products were sold in more than 7,000 retail stores, as well as in Bugle Boy's own discount outlets. By 1998, Bugle Boy was expanding into China. 

In 2001, Bugle Boy fell on hard times and closed all 215 of its United States outlet stores in an agreement with United States bankruptcy court. The store at Gurnee Mills remained open to sell off remaining inventory. Eventually, the company was sold for $68.8 million to Schottenstein Stores Corp., which has large stakes in American Eagle Outfitters and Value City Department Stores. As of 2015, the Bugle Boy brand is no longer in use.

Personal life
Mow married twice and has four children, two from each marriage. He was first married to Margarita Lee Ling Mow for 19 years, and they had two daughters, Genevieve Mow and Kathy Mow-McCarthy. His second marriage is to Rosa Wang Mow, and they have two children, a daughter named Hillary Mow and a son named Jason Mow. Mow also has four grandchildren from his marriage to Margarita Mow: Samuel Goodman, Clara McCarthy, Maggie McCarthy, and Kellan McCarthy and two grandchildren from his marriage to Rosa Mow: Valentina Willa Mow Cervieri and Carolina Sofia Mow Cervieri.

He received the Distinguished Engineering Alumnus Award from Purdue University. His oldest brother, Harry, first worked for the RAND Corporation and later formed Century West Development Inc. As CEO and chairman of the board, he led the development of many real estate projects in the greater Los Angeles area and across the country. Another brother, Donald Mow, worked for several architectural firms in New York City and was involved in the construction of the TWA terminal at JFK airport, before opening his own architectural design firm in Pleasantville, New York. His two younger brothers made careers in academia. Van C. Mow is a Professor of Biomechanics at Columbia University, while Maurice Mow was a Chair of the Department of Civil Engineering at California State University Chico.

References

1936 births
Living people
American chairpersons of corporations
American chief executives of fashion industry companies
American people of Chinese descent
Polytechnic Institute of New York University alumni
Purdue University College of Agriculture alumni
Rensselaer Polytechnic Institute alumni

zh:毛昭寰